Mariano Enrique Seccafien (born 23 June 1984 in Morón) is an Argentine football midfielder who plays for Los Andes in Argentina.

Career

Seccafien played for Deportivo Morón, where he debuted as a footballer, from 2002 to 2006. Then he emigrated to México to play in Tiburones Rojos de Coatzacoalcos from 2006 to 2007. Subsequently, he returned to Argentina to play in Rosario Central, returning to Deportivo Morón in 2010.

External links
 Enrique Seccafien at BDFA.com.ar 
 

1984 births
Living people
People from Morón Partido
Argentine footballers
Argentine expatriate footballers
Association football midfielders
Rosario Central footballers
Aldosivi footballers
C.D. Veracruz footballers
Deportivo Morón footballers
Expatriate footballers in Mexico
Sportspeople from Buenos Aires Province